Carlos Andrade Souza (born 23 January 1987), known as Carlinhos, is a Brazilian footballer who plays as a left back for Maringá.

Biography
Carlinhos started his career at Santos. His contract was due to expired in August 2008 but in June 2008 signed a new 3-year contract and joined Cruzeiro in a 6-month deal. In January 2009 he was signed by fellow São Paulo State club Mirassol in a 5-month loan. Carlinhos then sold to Brasa Futebol Clube for R$400,000 in 2009, a proxy club for third parties ownership. In December 2009 he was signed by Santo André in 1-year contract. In May 2010 Carlinhos was signed by Fluminense in 3-year deal.

National team

Carlinhos was called for Seleção for the first time in 2006, by Dunga, for a friendly against Switzerland. He returned to the national team six years later, in 2012, when, this time by Mano Menezes, was called up for Superclásico de las Américas. He made his debut for Brazil national football team on November 21, 2012, when Seleção won, after penalties, the title.

Additionally, Carlinhos was placed in the preliminary squad for the 2008 Summer Olympics, but eventually was not called for the final list of the tournament by coach Dunga.

Games for Brazilian team

Honours

Club
Santos
 São Paulo State League: 2006, 2007

Fluminense
 Campeonato Brasileiro Série A: 2010, 2012
 Rio de Janeiro State League: 2012

International
 South American Championship (U 20): 2007
 Superclásico de las Américas: 2012

Individual
 Campeonato Brasileiro Série A Team of the Year: 2012

References

External links
 santos.globo.com
 CBF
 sambafoot

1987 births
Living people
Brazilian footballers
Brazil youth international footballers
Brazil international footballers
Santos FC players
Cruzeiro Esporte Clube players
Mirassol Futebol Clube players
Esporte Clube Santo André players
Fluminense FC players
São Paulo FC players
Sport Club Internacional players
Paysandu Sport Club players
Centro Sportivo Alagoano players
Maringá Futebol Clube players
Campeonato Brasileiro Série A players
People from Vitória da Conquista
Association football defenders
Sportspeople from Bahia